Sunday Jang (born 1 August 1970) is a Cameroonian former footballer who played as a midfielder. He made ten appearances for the Cameroon national team in 1995 and 1996. He was also named in Cameroon's squad for the 1996 African Cup of Nations tournament.

References

1970 births
Living people
Cameroonian footballers
Association football midfielders
Cameroon international footballers
1996 African Cup of Nations players
Place of birth missing (living people)